Brock Benefield Vandagriff  (born May 30, 2002) is an American football quarterback for the Georgia Bulldogs. He was a member of the 2021 and 2022 Georgia Bulldogs that won back-to-back national championships.

High school career 
Vandagriff played high school football at Prince Avenue Christian School in Bogart, Georgia. Vandagriff was a five-star recruit coming out of high school. He originally committed to play college football at Oklahoma, but later decommitted after concerns about playing far away from home. He later committed to Georgia.

College career 
In Georgia's G-Day spring game Vandagriff went six of nine for 47 yards. He spent most of 2021 as a backup to Stetson Bennett and incumbent starter JT Daniels. He made his college football debut against UAB. He also played in reserve in Georgia's win over FCS opponent Charleston Southern. The team went on to win the Orange Bowl and a national championship.

In 2022, Vandagriff appeared in three games against Samford, South Carolina, and Vanderbilt. He only attempted two passes as both went for incompletions; he also had one rush attempt for seven yards. The team went on to win the Peach Bowl and back-to-back national championships.

In 2023, Vandagriff is expected to compete with redshirt junior Carson Beck and redshirt freshman Gunner Stockton.

Statistics

References

External links 

 Georgia Bulldogs bio

Living people
Players of American football from Georgia (U.S. state)
American football quarterbacks
Georgia Bulldogs football players
2002 births